Iron Eyes Cody (born Espera Oscar de Corti, April 3, 1904 – January 4, 1999) was an American actor of Italian descent who portrayed Native Americans in Hollywood films, famously as Chief Iron Eyes in Bob Hope's The Paleface (1948). He also played a Native American shedding a tear about litter in one of the country's most well-known television public service announcements from the group Keep America Beautiful. Living in Hollywood, he began to insist, even in his private life, that he was Native American, over time claiming membership in several different tribes. In 1996, Cody's half-sister said that he was of Italian ancestry, but he denied it. After his death, it was revealed that he was of Sicilian parentage, and not Native American at all.

Early life
Cody was born Espera Oscar de Corti on April 3, 1904, in Kaplan in Vermilion Parish, in southwestern Louisiana, a second son of Francesca Salpietra from Sicily and her husband, Antonio de Corti from southern Italy. He had two brothers, Joseph and Frank, and a sister, Victoria. His parents had a local grocery store in Gueydan, Louisiana, where he grew up. His father left the family and moved to Texas, where he took the name Tony Corti. His mother married Alton Abshire and had five more children with him.

When the three de Corti brothers were teenagers, they joined their father in Texas and shortened their last name from de Corti to Corti. Cody's father, Tony Corti, died in Texas in 1924. The brothers moved on to California, where they were acting in movies, and changed their surname to Cody. Joseph William and Frank Henry Cody worked as extras, then moved on to other work. Frank was killed by a hit-and-run driver in 1949.

Career
Cody began acting in the late 1920s. He worked in film and television until his death. Cody claimed his father was Cherokee and his mother Cree, also naming several different tribes, and frequently changing his claimed place of birth. To those unfamiliar with Indigenous American or First Nations cultures and people, he gave the appearance of living as if he were Native American, fulfilling the stereotypical expectations by wearing his film wardrobe as daily clothing—including braided wig, fringed leathers and beaded moccasins—at least when photographers were visiting, and in other ways continuing to play the same Hollywood-scripted roles off-screen as well as on.

He appeared in more than 200 films, including The Big Trail (1930), with John Wayne; The Scarlet Letter (1934), with Colleen Moore; Sitting Bull (1954), as Crazy Horse; The Light in the Forest (1958) as Cuyloga; The Great Sioux Massacre (1965), with Joseph Cotten; Nevada Smith (1966), with Steve McQueen; A Man Called Horse (1970), with Richard Harris; and Ernest Goes to Camp (1987) as Chief St. Cloud, with Jim Varney.

He also appeared in over a hundred television programs. In 1953, he appeared twice in Duncan Renaldo's syndicated television series, The Cisco Kid as Chief Sky Eagle. He guest starred on the NBC western series, The Restless Gun, starring John Payne, and The Tall Man, with Barry Sullivan and Clu Gulager. In 1961, he played the title role in "The Burying of Sammy Hart" on the ABC western series, The Rebel, starring Nick Adams. A close friend of Walt Disney, Cody appeared in a Disney studio serial titled The First Americans, and in episodes of The Mountain Man, Davy Crockett and Daniel Boone. In 1964 Cody appeared as Chief Black Feather on The Virginian in the episode "The Intruders." He also appeared in a 1974 episode of Mister Rogers' Neighborhood featuring Native American dancers.

Cody was widely seen as the "Crying Indian" in the "Keep America Beautiful" public service announcements (PSA) in the early 1970s. The environmental commercial, first aired on Earth Day in 1971, depicted Cody in costume, shedding a tear after trash is thrown from the window of a car and it lands at his feet. The announcer, William Conrad, says: "People start pollution; people can stop it." The ad won two Clio awards, incited a frenzy of community involvement, and "helped reduce litter by 88% across 38 states", according to one reliable source. Cody was a participant in the documentary series Hollywood (1980), where he discussed early Western filmmaker William S. Hart's use of Native American Sign Language.

The Joni Mitchell song "Lakota", from the 1988 album, Chalk Mark in a Rainstorm, features Cody's chanting. He made a cameo appearance in the 1990 film Spirit of '76.

Personal life and death
In 1936, Cody married archaeologist Bertha Parker. She was active in excavations during the late 1920s and early 1930s before becoming an assistant in archaeology at the Southwest Museum. They adopted two children said to be of Dakota-Maricopa origin, Robert Tree Cody and Arthur. The couple remained married until Bertha's death in 1978.

Although the non-Native public who knew him from the movies and television thought of Cody as a Native American, a 1996 story by The Times-Picayune in New Orleans questioned his heritage, reporting that he was a second-generation Italian-American. This was based on an interview with his half-sister, and documents including a baptismal record. Cody, who now wore his Hollywood costumes in daily life, denied the claim.

Cody died at the age of 94 from mesothelioma at home in Los Angeles on January 4, 1999. Before death, he had written this comment:
"Make me ready to stand before you with clean and straight eyes. When life fades, as the fading sunset, may our spirits stand before you without shame."

Honors
On April 20, 1983, he was inducted to the Hollywood Walk of Fame at 6601 Hollywood Boulevard.

In 1999, a Golden Palm Star on the Palm Springs, California, Walk of Stars was dedicated to him.

Partial filmography

Bibliography
Indian Talk: Hand Signals of the American Indians, 1970, 1991, Naturegraph Publishers, Inc.

See also
Chief Thundercloud
Grey Owl
Jamake Highwater
Pretendian
Rachel Dolezal
Red Thunder Cloud
Reel Injun
Sacheen Littlefeather

References

External links
 
 
 

20th-century American male actors
American male film actors
American male television actors
Male Western (genre) film actors
American people who self-identify as being of Native American descent
American people of Italian descent
Impostors
Male actors from Louisiana
People from Gueydan, Louisiana
People from Kaplan, Louisiana
Deaths from mesothelioma
Deaths from cancer in California
Burials at Hollywood Forever Cemetery
1904 births
1999 deaths